Mohd Rusdi Bin Mohd Suparman (born 27 January 1973) is a retired Malaysian footballer. He was known as Superman by his teammates and his fans. He is also a former member of the Malaysian pre-Olympic team and also the Malaysian national team.

He was one on the best players in Malaysia during the 2000s alongside Azman Adnan, Ahmad Shahrul Azhar Sofian and Hairuddin Omar.

Career
During 1993–1998, he partnered with Azman Adnan in front as they became the fierce striker for Selangor FA. When Azman left Selangor to Penang FA, Rusdi was partnered with Rudie Ramli and Mohd Nizaruddin Yusof. He once won the Premier League Malaysia Golden Boots award as he scored 15 goals for Selangor. He was a Selangor legend after he spent a long time with them. He won many trophies in Malaysian football such as the M-League title, the Malaysian FA Cup and the Malaysia Cup. Rusdi and Azman were the best strikers in Malaysia and the best striker partners 2000.

In 2002, he participated at the 2000 Tiger Cup. He was the oldest player in the team at the age of 27. He was given the number 9 shirt. Rusdi helped Malaysia to win the 3rd place at the tournament after beating Vietnam 3–0 which he scored 2 goals. Rusdi scored 4 goals in the tournament to become the 3rd top goal scorer. Rusdi have 35 caps and 18 goals for Malaysia.

After playing 10 years with Selangor. He retired in 2006 playing with his last club, Melaka Telekom and MPSJ FC. He also played for Selangor PKNS during 2003 until 2004.

Honours

Club
Selangor FA
 Liga Perdana 1: 2000
 Liga Semi-Pro Divisyen 2: 1993
 Malaysia Cup: 1995, 1996, 1997, 2002
 Malaysian FA Cup: 1997, 2001
 Malaysian Charity Shield: 1996, 1997, 2002

References

External links
 
 Malaysia National Football Team 2000–2003 Results

1973 births
Malaysian footballers
Malaysia international footballers
People from Selangor
Living people
Selangor FA players
Association football forwards